Xiang-Jin Meng, also known as X.J. Meng, is a Chinese-born American virologist. He is a university distinguished professor at Virginia Tech. He studies emerging, re-emerging and zoonotic viruses of veterinary and human public health significance. He was elected a member of the National Academy of Sciences in 2016, a Fellow of the National Academy of Inventors in 2014, and a Fellow of the American Academy of Microbiology in 2012.

Early life and education 
Meng grew up in Gaomi, Shandong Province, China. He originally planned to pursue a career in chemical engineering, but instead he enrolled in Binzhou Medical College in 1980 as a medical student.

Receiving his medical degree in 1985, Meng studied at the Wuhan University College of Medicine (formerly Hubei Medical College) and earned a Master's degree in Microbiology and Immunology. There, he discovered his passion and curiosity for virology, under the supervision of his graduate advisor, Yu Sun, who was an experimental virologist and pathologist. Earning his Master's in 1988, Meng worked as a research fellow for three years at the Shandong Academy of Medical Sciences in Jinan.

In 1991, he was admitted to the interdepartmental Immunobiology graduate program at the Iowa State University. His PhD dissertation focused on an emerging virus, porcine reproductive and respiratory syndrome virus, in the laboratory of Prem S. Paul. After receiving his PhD in Immunobiology, he joined the Laboratory of Infectious Diseases as a John E. Fogarty Visiting Scientist and later as a Senior Staff Fellow in the labs of Suzanne U. Emerson and Robert H. Purcell at the National Institute of Allergy and Infectious Diseases at NIH in Bethesda, Maryland.

Career and research 
Meng joined the faculty at Virginia Tech in 1999 as an Assistant Professor of Molecular Virology, and rose to the rank of full professor in 2007. He was named a university distinguished professor in 2013. His research mainly focuses on understanding the mechanism of virus replication and pathogenesis, defining the mechanisms of cross-species virus infection, and developing effective vaccines against emerging and zoonotic viruses.

Meng's group discovered the swine hepatitis E virus from pigs and avian hepatitis E virus from chickens, which eventually lead to the recognition of human hepatitis E as a zoonotic disease. Meng's research also led to the invention of the first U.S. Department of Agriculture fully-license commercial vaccine, currently on the global market, against porcine circovirus type 2 (PCV2) and its associated diseases. Additionally, Meng works on a number of other important viruses including Hepatitis E virus, Porcine Reproductive and Respiratory Syndrome Virus, Torque Teno Sus Virus, and Porcine Epidemic Diarrhea Virus.

Meng has authored and co-authored more than 340 peer-reviewed articles and book chapters, which have been cited for more than 28,300 times with a h-index of 89. He is ranked in the top 1% highly cited scientists in the field of microbiology (1997–2007) by Thomson Scientific's Essential Science Indicators. Meng is an inventor of more than 20 U.S. patent awards on viral vaccines and diagnostics.

Awards and honors 

 2018: The Inaugural Lorraine J. Hoffman Graduate Alumni Award, Iowa State University, Ames, Iowa.
 2017: State Council of Higher Education for Virginia (SCHEV) Outstanding Faculty Award.
 2016: Elected member of the National Academy of Sciences.
 2014: Elected Fellow of the National Academy of Inventors.
 2013: University Distinguished Professor title, a pre-eminent and life-time title bestowed by the university Board of Visitors.
 2012: Elected Fellow of the American Academy of Microbiology.

Selected publications

Meng, X.J.,P.S. Paul, and P.G. Halbur (1994). Molecular cloning and nucleotide sequencing of the 3' terminal genomic RNA of porcine reproductive and respiratory syndrome virus. Journal of General Virology 75:1795-1801. DOI: 10.1099/0022-1317-75-7-1795.
Meng, X.J., R.H. Purcell, P.G. Halbur, J.R. Lehman, D.M. Webb, T.S. Tsareva, J.S. Haynes, B.J. Thacker, and S.U. Emerson (1997). A novel virus in swine is closely related to the human hepatitis E virus. Proceedings of the National Academy of Sciences USA 94:9860-9865. DOI: 10.1073/pnas.94.18.9860.
 Meng, X.J., P.G. Halbur, M. Shapiro, S. Govindarajan, J.D. Bruna, I. K. Mushahwar, R.H. Purcell, and S.U. Emerson (1998). Genetic and experimental evidence for cross-species infection by the swine hepatitis E virus. Journal of Virology. 72:9714-9721. DOI: 10.1128/JVI.72.12.9714-9721.1998.
 Fenaux M, T. Opriessnig, P.G. Halbur, F. Elvinger, and X.J. Meng (2004). A Chimeric Porcine Circovirus (PCV) with the Immunogenic Capsid Gene of the Pathogenic PCV2 Cloned Into the Genomic Backbone of the Non-Pathogenic PCV1 Induces Protective Immunity Against PCV2 Infection in Pigs. Journal of Virology. 78:6297-6303. DOI: 10.1128/JVI.78.12.6297-6303.2004.
Billam P., F.F. Huang, Z.F. Sun, F.W. Pierson, R.B. Duncan, F. Elvinger, D.K. Guenette, T.E. Toth, and X. J. Meng (2005). Systematic pathogenesis and replication of avian hepatitis E virus in specific-pathogen-free adult chickens. Journal of Virology. 79(6):3429-37. DOI: 10.1128/JVI.79.6.3429-3437.2005.
Huang YW, K.K. Harrall, B.A. Dryman, T. Opriessnig, E.M. Vaughn, M.B. Roof, and X.J. Meng. 2012. Serological profile of Torque teno sus virus species 1 (TTSuV1) in pigs and antigenic relationships between two TTSuV1 genotypes (1a and 1b), between two species (TTSuV1 and 2), and between porcine and human anelloviruses. Journal of Virology. 86(19):10628-10639. DOI: 10.1128/JVI.00176-12.
Huang YW, A.W. Dickerman, P. Pineyro, L. Li, L. Fang, R. Kiehne, T. Opriessnig, and X.J. Meng. 2013. Origin, evolution, and genotyping of emergent porcine endemic diarrhea virus (PEDV) strains in the United States. mBio. 4(5):e00737-13. doi:10.1128/mBio.00737-13.
Cao D, Cao QM, Subramaniam S, Yugo DM, Heffron CL, Rogers AJ, Kenney SP, Tian D, Matzinger SR, Overend C, Catanzaro N, LeRoith T, Wang H, Piñeyro P, Lindstrom N, Clark-Deener S, Yuan L, and X.J. Meng. 2017. Pig model mimicking chronic hepatitis E virus infection in immunocompromised patients to assess immune correlates during chronicity. Proceedings of the National Academy of Sciences USA. 114(27):6914-6923. DOI: 10.1073/pnas.1705446114.
Sooryanrain H, C.L. Heffron, and X.J. Meng. 2020. The U-rich untranslated regions (UTR) of the hepatitis E virus induces differential type I and type III interferon responses in a host cell-dependent manner. mBio. 11:e03103-19. https://doi.org/10.1128/mBio.03103-19.

References 

Living people
Year of birth missing (living people)
Members of the United States National Academy of Sciences
Virginia Tech faculty
Fellows of the National Academy of Inventors
Iowa State University alumni
American virologists
Chinese emigrants to the United States
People from Gaomi
Scientists from Shandong
Wuhan University alumni